Bidenichthys is a genus of viviparous brotulas.

Etymology
The genus is named after C. Leo Biden, who collected one of the type specimens of Bidenichthys capensis and donated many specimens to the South African Museum.

Species
There are currently three recognized species in this genus:
 Bidenichthys beeblebroxi Paulin, 1995: "Found in holes beneath rocks and boulders from the surface to 30 m around the North Island and northern part of South Island, New Zealand. Common."
 Bidenichthys capensis Barnard, 1934 (Freetail brotula): The type species for the genus; "intertidal in rocky tidepools from East London to the Cape of Good Hope, South Africa. Uncommon."
 Bidenichthys consobrinus (F. W. Hutton, 1876) (Grey brotula): "Rocky areas at depths of 30 to 178 m off northern New Zealand. Rare."
 Bidenichthys okamotoi Møller, Schwarzhans, Lauridsen & Nielsen, 2021

References

Bythitidae
Taxa named by Keppel Harcourt Barnard